Stierop is a hamlet in the Dutch province of North Holland. It is a part of the municipality of Castricum, and lies about 9 km south of Alkmaar. Until 1 January 2002, Stierop belonged to the municipality of Akersloot.

Stierop has about 20 inhabitants.

References

Populated places in North Holland